Andri Frischknecht (born 7 July 1994) is a Swiss cross-country mountain biker. He is the son of Thomas Frischknecht, and the grandson of Peter Frischknecht, who were also professional cyclists.

Major results

Mountain Bike

2014
 2nd  Team relay, UCI World Championships
2015
 1st  Cross-country, National Under-23 Championships
 2nd  Team relay, UEC European Championships
2017
 1st  Team relay, UEC European Championships
2018
 1st  Overall Swiss Epic (with Matthias Stirnemann)
2021
 Swiss Bike Cup
2nd Gränichen
2nd Schaan
3rd Savognin
3rd Lugano
2022
 Swiss Bike Cup
1st Rickenbach
2nd Gränichen
 National Championships
3rd Cross-country
3rd Short track

Cyclo-cross

2011–2012
 2nd National Junior Championships
2014–2015
 2nd National Under-23 Championships
2017–2018
 3rd Flückiger Cross Madiswil
 3rd Dagmersellen
2018–2019
 2nd National Championships
2019–2020
 3rd GP Luzern/Pfaffnau
2021–2022
 3rd Meilen
2022–2023
 3rd Meilen

References

External links

1994 births
Living people
Swiss male cyclists
Cross-country mountain bikers
Swiss mountain bikers
Cyclo-cross cyclists